Olympic Club is an Egyptian football and sports club based in Alexandria, Egypt. The club currently plays in the Egyptian Second Division, the second-highest league in the Egyptian football league system. 'Izz al-Din Yacoub' Stadium is the home ground for the club, which has been renovated in 2019 for 20 million EGP.

Founded in 1905, the club is known for being one of the oldest clubs in Egypt and Africa, and it is mostly known for its achievements in the Track and field games for winning several medals in continental championships and also in the Olympiad (10 medals out of the Egypt's total of 26); and its football team is also known for winning the Egyptian Premier League once in 1966 and for winning the Egypt Cup twice in 1933 and 1934.

Name changes
 Red Star Club (1905–1924)
 Olympic Club (1924–Present)

Football
The football Team's golden age was in the 1960s when the team could defeat Egypt's strongest teams at that time, winning the Egyptian Premier League in 1966. The team's level began to drop due to financial problems, until it was relegated in the 2008–09 season and has never showed up in the Premier League since.

Honors
Egyptian Premier League: 1
1965–66

Egypt Cup: 2
1932–33, 1933–34

Performance in CAF competitions
FR = First round
SR = Second round

Notes

References

External links
Official El-Olympi site

Egyptian Second Division
1905 establishments in Egypt
Football clubs in Alexandria